France is characterised by numerous political trends. This article provides an overview of some of them.

Left and Right in France and the main political parties
Since the 1789 French Revolution, the political spectrum in France has obeyed the left–right distinction. However, due to the historical association of the term droite (right) with monarchism, conservative or right-wing parties have tended to avoid officially describing themselves as representing the "right wing".

Contemporary French politics are characterised by two politically opposed groupings: one left-wing, centred on the French Socialist Party, and the other right-wing, centred previously around the Rassemblement pour la République (RPR) and its successor the Union for a Popular Movement (UMP), today called Les Republicains. The executive branch is currently composed mostly of the Socialist Party.

The Left

At the beginning of the 20th century, the French Left divided itself into:
 The Anarchists, who were more active in trade unions (they controlled the CGT from 1906 to 1909).
 Revolutionaries: the SFIO founded by Jean Jaurès, Jules Guesde etc.
 Reformists: the Republican, Radical and Radical-Socialist Party and non-SFIO socialists.

After World War I
 Unlike those in Spain, the Anarchists lost popularity and significance due to the nationalism brought about by World War I and lost the CGT majority.  They joined the CGT-U and later created the CGT-SR.
 The SFIO split in the 1920 Tours Congress, where a majority of SFIO members created the French Section of the Communist International (the future PCF).
 The SFIC, which quickly turned into a pro-Stalinist and isolated party (with no alliances), lost many of its original members, and changed only in 1934 (after a fascist attack to the Parliament on 6 February 1934) when it combined with the Popular Front.
The minority of the SFIO who refused to join the Comintern retained the name and, led by Léon Blum, gradually regained ground from the Communists.
 The Radical Party, which inherited of the tradition of the French Left and of Radical Republicanism (sharing left-wing traits such as anti-clericalism), progressively moved more and more to the mainstream center, being one of the main governing parties between the two World Wars.

The Left was in power during:

The Radicals and the SFIO, who do not participate in the government), from 1924 to 1926.
From 1932 to the 6 February 1934 crisis (Radicals and independent socialists).
Under the Popular Front (Radicals, SFIO, PCF) in 1936 to 1938 under Socialist Léon Blum and then Radical Camille Chautemps.

After World War II

The Old Left
 The anarchist movements.
 The PCF remained an important force (around 28% in elections) despite it being in perpetual opposition after May 1947. From 1956 to the end of the 1970s it was interested in the ideas of "eurocommunism".
 The SFIO declined from 23.5% in 1946 to 15% in 1956 and increased only in 1967 (19.0%). It was in government from 1946 to 1951 and 1956–1958. It was transformed in 1971 (congrès d'Épinay) in the Parti Socialiste by reunion of various socialists "clubs", the SFIO,...
After 1959, both parties were in opposition until 1981. They had formed a coalition (with the Party Radical de Gauche) called the "Union de la Gauche" between 1972 and 1978.

The New Left (or Second Left)
The Old Left was contested on its left by the New Left parties including the:
Cornelius Castoriadis's Socialisme ou Barbarie from 1948 to 1965
Advocates of new social movements (including Michel Foucault, Gilles Deleuze, Pierre Bourdieu)
Arlette Laguiller's Workers' Struggle
The Revolutionary Communist League
Others components of the New Left included the environmentalists (who would eventually found The Greens in 1982)

However, the emblem of the New Left was the Unified Socialist Party, or PSU.

The Moderate Centre-Left
The Radical Party, despite some ambiguities (support to Pierre Mendès-France's center-left Republican Front during the 1956 legislative elections), finally embraced economic liberalism and slid to the center-right. But in 1972, left-wing Radicals split to form the Left Radical Party.

After the end of the Cold War
In 1993, Jean-Pierre Chevènement left the PS to form the Citizen and Republican Movement (MRC), a left-wing eurosceptic party attached to the tradition of republicanism and universalism (secularism, equal opportunities, opposition to multiculturalism).
In 1994, communist and socialist dissidents created the Convention for a Progressive Alternative, a party with an eco-socialist platform, and they have 1 deputy, 8 mayors, and some councillors. They remain present in the Haute-Vienne and Val-de-Marne.
In the 1990s and 2000s, some parties continued the inheritance of the PSU like Les Alternatifs, or ANPAG.
The New Anticapitalist Party is founded in an attempt to unify the fractured movements of the French radical Left, and attract new activists drawing on the relative combined strength of far-left parties in presidential elections in 2002, where they achieved 10.44% of the vote, and 2007 (7.07%)?

The Right

The right-wing has been divided into three broad families by historian René Rémond.

Legitimists
Counter-revolutionaries who opposed all change since the French Revolution. Today, they are located on the far-right of the French political spectrum.

These included:
The ultra-royalists during the Bourbon Restoration
The Action française monarchist movement
The supporters of the Vichy regime's Révolution nationale
The activists of the OAS during the Algerian War (1954–1962)
Most components of Jean-Marie Le Pen's National Front
Philippe de Villiers' conservative Movement for France

Orleanists
Orleanists had rallied the Republic at the end of the 19th century and advocated economic liberalism (referred to in French simply as libéralisme). Today, they are broadly classified as centre-right or centrist parties.

These included:
The right-wing of the Radical Party
The Democratic and Socialist Union of the Resistance
The Christian-democratic Popular Republican Movement (MRP)
Valéry Giscard d'Estaing's Independent Republicans
The Union for a French Democracy

Today, a large majority of the politicians of Nicolas Sarkozy's ruling Union for a Popular Movement can be classified in this family.

Bonapartists
These included:
Charles de Gaulle's various parties: first the Rally of the French People,
then the Union of Democrats for the Republic
But also Boulangisme or Poujadisme

Today
The Gaullist UDR was then transformed by Jacques Chirac in the Rally for the Republic (RPR) in 1976, a neo-Gaullist party which embraced economic liberalism.

In 2002, the Gaullist RPR and the Union for French Democracy merged into the Union for a Popular Movement(UPM), although some elements of the old UDF remained outside the new alliance.

In 2007, a section of the remaining UDF, headed by François Bayrou, refused to align themselves on Nicolas Sarkozy and created the MoDem in an attempt to make space for a center-right party.

In conclusion, Jean-Marie Le Pen managed to unify most of the French far-right in the National Front, created in 1972 in the aftermaths of the Algerian War, which succeeded in gaining influence starting in the 1980s.

Residual monarchists movements, inheritors of Charles Maurras' Action française, also managed to survive, although many of them joined Le Pen's FN in the 1980s. Some neo-fascists who considered Le Pen to be too moderate broke away in 1974 to form the Parti des forces nouvelles, which maintained close links to the far-right students' union Groupe Union Défense.

Another important theoretical influence in the far-right appeared in the 1980s with Alain de Benoist's Nouvelle Droite movement, organized into the GRECE.

Despite Le Pen's success in the 2002 presidential election,
his party has been weakened by Bruno Mégret's spin-out, leading to the creation of the National Republican Movement, as well as by the concurrence of Philippe de Villiers' Movement for France, and also by the internal struggles concerning Le Pen's forthcoming succession.

The Fifth Republic (1958–1981) 

During the Fifth Republic, founded in 1958 amid the troubles brought by the Algerian War (1954–62), France was ruled by successive right-wing administrations until 1981.
The successive governments generally applied the Gaullist program of national independence, and modernization in a dirigiste fashion.

The political instability characteristic of the Fourth Republic was gone. The far-right extremists who had threatened military coups over the question of French Algeria largely receded after Algeria was granted independence. The French Communist Party's image gradually became less radical. Politics largely turned into a Gaullists vs left-wing opposition.

The Gaullist government, however, was criticized for its heavy-handedness: while elections were free, the state had a monopoly on radio and TV broadcasting and sought to have its point of view on events imposed (this monopoly was not absolute, however, since there were radio stations transmitting from nearby countries specifically for the benefit of the French).

Although Gaullism, which had gained legitimacy during World War II, initially also attracted several left-wing individuals, Gaullism in government became decidedly conservative.

In 1962, de Gaulle had the French citizens vote in a referendum concerning the election of the president at universal suffrage, something which had been discredited since Napoleon III's 1851 coup.
3/5 of the voters approved however the referendum, and thereafter the President of the French Republic was elected at universal suffrage, giving him increased authority on the Parliament. De Gaulle won the 1965 presidential election, opposed on his left by François Mitterrand who had taken the lead of the Federation of the Democratic and Socialist Left, a coalition of most left-wing parties (apart from the French Communist Party, then led by Waldeck Rochet who did call to vote for Mitterrand).

In May 1968, a series of worker strikes and student riots rocked France. These did not, however, result in an immediate change of government, with a right-wing administration being triumphantly reelected in the snap election of June 1968.
However, in 1969 the French electorate turned down a referendum on the reform of the French Senate proposed by de Gaulle. Since the latter had always declared that in the eventuality of a "NO" to a referendum he would resign, the referendum was also a plebiscite.
Thus, the rejection of the reform by more than 52% of the voters was widely considered to be mostly motivated by weariness with de Gaulle, and ultimately provoked his resignation that year.

May '68 and its aftermaths saw the occupation of the LIP factory in Besançon, one of the major social conflict of the 1970s, during which the CFDT and the Unified Socialist Party, of which Pierre Mendès-France was a member, theorized workers' self-management.
Apart of the PSU, the autonomist movement, inspired by Italian operaismo, made its first appearance on the political scene.

Georges Pompidou, de Gaulle's Prime Minister, was elected in 1969, remaining President until his death in 1974.
In 1972, 3/5 of the French approved by referendum the enlargement of the European Economic Community (CEE) to the United Kingdom, Denmark, Ireland, and Norway.

After Pompidou's sudden death, Valéry Giscard d'Estaing managed to overhaul the remaining Gaullist barons – with the help of Jacques Chirac —, and won the subsequent election against François Mitterrand on the left.
Giscard transformed the ORTF, the state organism in charge of media, and created several different channels, including Radio France.
However, it was not until François Mitterrand's accession to the Élysée Palace in 1981 that media were liberalized.

The Fifth Republic (1981–1995) 

In 1981, François Mitterrand, a Socialist, was elected president, on a program of far-reaching reforms (110 Propositions for France). This was enabled by the 1972 Common Program between the PS, the PRG and the PCF – which had remained, just as in Italy, a strong party throughout the Cold War.

After securing a majority in parliament through a snap election, his government ran a program of social and economic reforms:
 social policies:
 abolition of the death penalty;
 removal of legislation criminalizing certain homosexual behaviors: lowering of the age of consent for homosexual sex to that for heterosexual sex (since the French Revolution, France had never criminalized homosexuality between adults in private)
liberalization of media
creation of a solidarity tax on wealth (ISF) and reform of the inheritance tax
 economic policies:
 the government embarked on a wave of nationalizations;
 the duration of the legal workweek was set to 39 hours, instead of the previous 40 hours.
increase of the SMIC minimum wages
 institutional reforms:
repealing of exceptional judicial procedures (courts-martial in peace-time, etc.)

However, in 1983, high inflation and economic woes forced a dramatic turnaround with respect to economic policies, known as rigueur (rigor) – the Socialist-Communist government then embarked on policies of fiscal and spending restraint.
Though the nationalizations were subsequently reversed by both subsequent left-wing and right-wing governments, the social reforms undertaken have remained standing.

Furthermore, the end of the Trente Glorieuses (Thirty Glorious) period of growth witnesses the beginning of a structural unemployment, which became an important political issue.
Since the 1980s, unemployment has remained permanently high, at about 10% of the population, regardless of the policies applied to fight it.

In 1986, Jacques Chirac's neo-Gaullist Rally for the Republic (RPR) party won the legislative election.

For the first time in the Fifth Republic, a left-wing President was forced to work together with a right-wing Prime minister, leading to the first cohabitation. Although many commentators were surprised at the time, and considered it to be an institutional crisis, some claiming the Fifth Republic could not accommodate itself of such rivalry at the head of the state, cohabitation repeated itself after the 1993 elections, when the RPR again won the elections, and then after the 1997 elections, when the Socialist Party won, leading to the constitution of Lionel Jospin's Plural Left government while Chirac was only at the beginning of his first presidential term.
The tradition in periods of "cohabitation" (a President of one party, prime minister of another) is for the President to exercise the primary role in foreign and security policy, with the dominant role in domestic policy falling to the prime minister and his government. Jospin stated, however, that he would not a priori leave any domain exclusively to the President, as that was a tradition issued from de Gaulle.

Since then, the government alternated between a left-wing coalition (composed of the French Socialist Party (PS), the French Communist Party (PCF) and more recently Les Verts, the Greens) and a right-wing coalition (composed of Jacques Chirac's Rally for the Republic (RPR), later replaced by the Union for a Popular Movement (UMP), and the Union for French Democracy, UDF).
Those two coalitions are fairly stable; there have been none of the mid-term coalition reorganizations and governments frequently overthrown which were commonplace under the Fourth Republic.

The 1980s and 1990s saw also the rise of Jean-Marie Le Pen's National Front (FN), a far-right party which blames immigration, more particularly immigration from North African countries such as Algeria, for increased unemployment and crime.
The social situation in the French suburbs (banlieues: literally, "suburbs", but in France a euphemism for large suburban housing projects for the poor, with a high proportion of the population of North African descent) still have to be successfully tackled.
Jean-Marie Le Pen's relative success at the French Presidential election, 2002 has been attributed in part to concerns about juvenile criminality.

Massive general strikes followed by all the trade-unions were triggered in November–December 1995, paralyzing France, in protest against the Juppé plan of libéral (in French, free market) reforms.
These strikes were generally considered a turning point in the French social movement.
It remains to be seen how much of these reforms will now be enacted by Sarkozy's first government, as Sarkozy was elected President on a similar platform in May 2007.

The Fifth Republic (1995–present)

During his first two years in office, President Jacques Chirac's prime minister was Alain Juppé, who served contemporaneously as leader of Chirac's neo-Gaullist Rally for the Republic (RPR). Chirac and Juppé benefited from a very large, if rather unruly, majority in the National Assembly (470 out of 577 seats).

Mindful that the government might have to take politically costly decisions in advance of the legislative elections planned for spring 1998 in order to ensure that France met the Maastricht criteria for the single currency of the EU, Chirac decided in April 1997 to call early elections.

The Left, led by Socialist Party leader Lionel Jospin, whom Chirac had defeated in the 1995 presidential race, unexpectedly won a solid National Assembly majority (319 seats, with 289 required for an absolute majority). President Chirac named Jospin prime minister on 2 June, and Jospin went on to form a Plural Left government composed primarily of Socialist ministers, along with some ministers from allied parties of the left, such as the Communist Party and the Greens.

Jospin stated his support for continued European integration and his intention to keep France on the path towards Economic and Monetary Union, albeit with greater attention to social concerns.

Chirac and Jospin worked together, for the most part, in the foreign affairs field with representatives of the presidency and the government pursuing a single, agreed French policy. Their "cohabitation" arrangement was the longest-lasting in the history of the Fifth Republic.

The right in power 2002–2012

However, it ended subsequent to the legislative elections that followed Chirac's decisive defeat of Jospin (who failed even to make it through to the runoff) in the 2002 presidential election.

This led to President Chirac's appointment of Jean-Pierre Raffarin (UMP) as the new prime minister.

On 29 May 2005, French voters in the referendum on the Treaty establishing a Constitution for Europe turned down the proposed charter by a wide margin.

This was generally regarded as a rebuke to Chirac and his government as well as the PS leadership, the majority save for the leftist faction and Laurent Fabius – had supported the proposed constitution.
Two days later, Raffarin resigned and Chirac appointed Dominique de Villepin, formerly Foreign Minister as Prime Minister of France.

An enduring force is Jean-Marie Le Pen's National Front party, whose anti-immigration, isolationist policies have been described by critics as inspired by xenophobia. Le Pen's survival into the runoff of 2002 had many observers worried this time, but in the 2007 first round Le Pen finished a distant fourth.

The 23 February 2005 French law on colonialism was met by a public uproar on the left-wing. Voted by the UMP majority, it was charged with advocating historical revisionism, and after long debates and international opposition (from Abdelaziz Bouteflika or Aimé Césaire, founder of the Négritude movement), was repealed by Jacques Chirac himself.

In Autumn 2005, civil unrest erupted in a number of lower classes suburbs due to the violence of the police. As a result, the government invoked a state of emergency which lasted until January 2006.

In 2006, Prime Minister Dominique de Villepin enacted amendments that established a First Employment Contract, known as the CPE, a special kind of employment contract under which workers under the age of 26 could be hired and fired liberally.

Proponents of the measure argued that French workforce laws, which put the burden of proof on the employer for dismissing employees, dissuaded employers from hiring new employees; according to them, this is one reason while the unemployment rate of those under 26 is 23% and that of youngsters from some lower classes neighbourhoods as high as 40%, and not the refusal of exploitation to enrich the wealthy class.

However, the plan backfired, with criticism both on the way the law was passed (using an exceptional legislative procedure) and on the law itself, which was criticized both for weakening workers' rights in general, and for singling out the young disfavourably instead of attempting to cure more general issues. Following the 2006 protests against the CPE, the government had to withdraw the legislation.

Following from these events, Villepin lost all hopes of winning the presidency, and his government no longer tried to enact reforms.

The issue of liberalism or socialism

One of the great questions of current French politics is that of libéralisme – that is, economic liberalism, individualism society and the market system, as opposed to government intervention in the economy. Broadly speaking, supporters of libéralisme want to let the forces of the free market operate with less regulation. For example, they want little regulation of the workforce and repeal of French laws setting a 35-hour work week rather than leaving this to contract negotiations. Critics of libéralisme argue that governmental intervention is necessary for the welfare of workers; they point out that great gains in workers' rights were historically achieved by government intervention and social mobilization, as during the Popular Front. Similarly, proponents of libéralisme favour free markets and the free movement of goods, which critics contend benefit the wealthy class at the expense of the ordinary worker.

According to historian René Rémond's famous classification of the right-wings in France, this libérale tradition belongs to the Orleanist inheritance, while Gaullists inherited from Bonapartism and a tradition of state intervention issued from the National Council of Resistance (CNR)'s welfare state program after the war. However, neo-Gaullists have since rallied economic liberalism, with the result that modern French conservatives – such as the UMP, or before that the RPR, the UDF or the Independent Republicans – all supported economic liberalism. The so-called right-wing of the Socialist Party: François Hollande, Dominique Strauss-Kahn, Ségolène Royal have done likewise.

Some rightists, such as Nicolas Sarkozy, favour radical change in the relationship between the government and the free-market. They argue that for the last 30 years, under both left-wing and right-wing governments, the French have been misled into believing that things could go on without real reforms. One may say that they favour a Thatcherite approach. Others on the right (including Dominique de Villepin) as well as some on the left argue in favour of gradual reforms. In comparison, the 2005 refusal of the French electorate to vote for the proposed European Constitution was interpreted by some – in particular the French Communist Party and far-left parties such as LO or the LCR – as a popular refusal of libéralisme, which the European Union is perceived to embody. Some such as Laurent Fabius have argued that the Socialist Party should thus have a more "left-wing" line.

Libertarianism as such is rare in France; it is considered a form of ultra-liberalism or neo-liberalism and upheld only by very few right-wingers, such as Alain Madelin.

2012 presidential campaign

2017 presidential campaign

Unions and leaders
Workers' unions.

 Confédération Générale du Travail (CGT): around 800,000 claimed members. It had traditional ties with the French Communist Party, but is currently tending more towards social-democratic views. 34.00%. General secretary : Philippe Martinez
 Confédération Française Démocratique du Travail (CFDT): about 800,000 members. Considered to be close to the more reformist factions of the PS, and the first to sign with "patronat". 21.81%. General secretary : Laurent Berger
 Force Ouvrière (FO): 500,000 members. Anarcho-syndicalism to yellow syndicalism, depend of the union, split from the CGT (1947). 15.81%. General secretary: Jean-Claude Mailly
 Confédération Française des Travailleurs Chrétiens (CFTC): 140,000 members. Christian reformist. 8.69%. President: Jacques Voisin
 Confédération Générale des Cadres (CFE-CGC): Reformist, White-collar and executive workers union which claims 180,000 members. 8.19%. President : Philippe Louis
 Union Nationale des Syndicats Autonomes (UNSA): 360,000 members. Reformist. 6.25%. general secretary: Alain Olive
 Solidaires Unitaires Démocratiques, (SUD): heir of the "Group of 10", a group of radical trade unions ("syndicalisme de lutte"), 110,000 members, 3.82% ;
 Confédération Nationale du Travail (CNT): Anarcho-syndicalist trade union which claims 8,000 members

Employers' organisations.

 Movements of French Corporations (Mouvement des Entreprises de France (MEDEF), formerly known as CNPF), sometimes referred to as patronat.
 General confederation of the little and middle corporations ("Confédération Générale des Petites et Moyennes Entreprises") (CGPME), aligned its position to the MEDEF.

See also

Anti-nuclear movement in France
 Balladur jurisprudence
History of the French far right
History of the Left in France
History of anarchism in France
Liberalism and Radicalism in France
Political party strength in France
Sinistrisme

References

Further reading
 McClelland, J. S., ed. The French Right, from de Maistre to Maurras, in series, Roots of the Right and also Harper Torchbooks. New York: Harper & Row, 1971, cop. 1970. 320 p.  pbk

External links
France’s Lost and Found Ideals by Patrice de Beer
Vive la Revolution? by Marc Perelman, The Nation, 29 April 2009
Will 2010 regional elections lead to political shake-up? Radio France Internationale in English
www.frenchpolitics.fr Follow French politics in the run up to the 2012 Presidential election.

 
Politics of France